The "gentry", or "landed gentry" in China was the elite who held privileged status through passing the Imperial exams, which made them eligible to hold office.  These literati, or scholar-officials, (shenshi 紳士 or jinshen 縉紳), also called 士紳 shishen "scholar gentry" or 鄉紳 xiangshen "local gentry", held a virtual monopoly on office holding, and overlapped with an unofficial elite of the wealthy. The Tang and  Song dynasties expanded the civil service exam to replace the nine-rank system which favored hereditary and largely military aristocrats. As a social class they included retired mandarins or their families and descendants. Owning land was often their way of preserving wealth.

Confucian classes 
The Confucian ideal of the four occupations ranked the scholar-official above farmers, artisans, and merchants below them in descending order, but this ideal fell short of describing society. Unlike a caste this status was not inherited.  In theory, any male child could study, pass the exams, and attain office. In practice, however, gentry families were more able to educate their sons and used their connections with local officials to protect their interests.

Members of the gentry were expected to be an example to their community as Confucian gentlemen. They often retired to landed estates, where they lived on the rent from tenant farmers. The sons of gentry aspired to pass the imperial exams and continue the family legacy. By late imperial China, merchants used their wealth to educate their sons in hopes of entering the civil service. Financially desperate gentry married into merchant families which led to a breakdown of the old class structure. 

With the abolition of the exam system and the overthrow of the Qing dynasty came the end of the scholar-official as a legal group.

20th century attacks on landlords 

The imperial government and scholar-official system ended but the landlord-tenant system did not. New Culture, radicals of the 1920s used the term "gentry" to criticize land owners as "feudal". Mao Zedong led the way in attacking "bad gentry and local bullies" for collecting high rent and oppressing their tenants during the Republican period. Many local landlords organized gangs to enforce their rule. Communist organizers promised agrarian reform and land redistribution. 

After the People's Republic of China was established, many landlords were executed by class struggle trials and the class as a whole was abolished. Former members were stigmatized and faced persecution which reached its heights during the Cultural Revolution. This persecution ended with the advent of Chinese economic reform under Deng Xiaoping.

See also 
 Chinese nobility
 Society and culture of the Han Dynasty
 Cabang Atas, the Chinese gentry of colonial Indonesia

References

Sources 
 

Gentry
Social history of China
Social class in China
Chinese landlords